Mediastinal lymphadenopathy or mediastinal adenopathy is an enlargement of the mediastinal lymph nodes.

Causes
There are many possible causes of mediastinal lymphadenopathy, including: 
Tuberculosis
Sarcoidosis
Lung cancer/oesophageal cancer
Lymphangitis carcinomatosa
Cystic fibrosis
Histoplasmosis
Acute lymphoblastic leukemia
Coccidioidomycosis
Lymphoma
Whipple's disease
Goodpasture syndrome
Hypersensitivity pneumonitis
Inflammatory response to Silicone (leaked from ruptured implants) which has migrated and collected in mediastinal lymph nodes. Silicone mediastinal lymphadenopathy.

See also
Lymphadenopathy
Mediastinum
Mediastinal lymph node
Mediastinal mass
Neoplasia

References

Medical signs